Jin Hwan (1913 – 1951) was a Korean painter. His work was part of the painting event in the art competition at the 1936 Summer Olympics.

In 1946, he served as the principal of Youngsun High School in Gochang founded by his father. In 1948, he served as a professor at Hongik University in Seoul. In 1951, he died in Gochang during the Third Battle of Seoul of the Korean War.

References

1913 births
1951 deaths
20th-century Korean painters
Korean painters
Olympic competitors in art competitions
Academic staff of Hongik University
People from Gochang County
Yeoyang Jin clan
Military personnel killed in the Korean War